Queen's Evidence is a 1919 British silent adventure film directed by James Mackay and starring Godfrey Tearle, Unity More and Janet Alexander. It was based on the play Adam and Eve by C.E. Munro and Louisa Parr. A smuggler tries to place the blame on his brother when the coast guard begin closing in on him.

Cast
 Godfrey Tearle as Adam Pascal
 Unity More as Eve Pascall
 Janet Alexander as Joan Hocking
 Lauderdale Maitland as Jerrem
 Edward Sorley as Jonathan
 Bruce Winston as Job
 Pardoe Woodman as Reuben May
 Ada King

References

External links

1919 films
1919 adventure films
British films based on plays
British silent feature films
British black-and-white films
British adventure films
1910s English-language films
1910s British films
Silent adventure films